Red Cloud Indian School is a private, Catholic, K–12 school run by the Jesuits in Oglala Lakota County, South Dakota. It is located in the Diocese of Rapid City and serves Oglala Lakota Native American children on the Pine Ridge Indian Reservation.

The main campus has a Pine Ridge postal address. It is not in the Pine Ridge census-designated place. This campus includes Red Cloud Elementary School ( and Red Cloud High School.

The other campus, Our Lady of Lourdes Elementary School, is adjacent to the Porcupine CDP and has a Porcupine address.

Background
The school was founded in 1888 as Holy Rosary Mission. The Jesuits and Sisters of St. Francis of Penance and Christian Charity founded the institution at the request of Chief Red Cloud. Once the school had been approved, the construction of the main mission building began. All of the bricks for the building were made from local clay and lime on the grounds of what is today Red Cloud Indian School's Pine Ridge campus. It was the only two-story building in the area. The four-school, K–12 school system was renamed Red Cloud in 1969.

The student population quickly grew to more than 100 students. Students were divided into three classes: one for all younger students and separate classes for older girls and older boys. The older students spent half their day learning reading, writing, and arithmetic and the other half performing domestic duties to keep the mission running. The young women often worked in the kitchen and laundry rooms, while the young men spent their time in the wood and metal shops, or farming the land.

The second K-8 school, Our Lady of Lourdes, became a part of the Red Cloud System in 1931. It had been established in 1929.

Red Cloud High School opened in 1937. Five students graduated from the school in 1942, with Oryal Cuny as the salutatorian and Lyle Clifford as the valedictorian. Classes became integrated and the boarding parts of the school were closed. The farms associated with the school were converted to various uses like football fields, field houses, and parking lots.

The school began closing dormitories in the 1960s.

In 1969, Holy Rosary Mission was officially renamed Red Cloud Indian School, both as a token of respect for the man whose work had made the school possible and as part of a program of re-identification to emphasize its native-American roots over cultural imperialism, and the lasting bond between groups from two separate cultures who wanted to enhance the best parts of both worlds to serve the people of the Pine Ridge Indian Reservation.

In 1980 the remaining dormitories closed.

Present day
 Red Cloud High School boasts 72 Bill and Melinda Gates Millennium Scholarship recipients, the highest per capita in the country.
 Seniors have been awarded full tuition with room and board at Dartmouth College, Stanford University, Duke University, Marquette University, and Creighton University, among many others.
 All graduates have plans to further their education and training, attending more than 25 colleges today, like Princeton, Arizona State, New Mexico, and Black Hills State.
 Students intern at nationally recognized organizations including the Institute of Medicine and the National Institutes of Health.
 All of high school students volunteer on the reservation. Some travel as far as Washington DC to give back to other communities.
 The Heritage Center is home to 10,000 pieces of the Native American contemporary and historical Lakota art, which has all been digitally cataloged.
 The Red Cloud Indian Art Show welcomes nearly 200 artists, both seasoned professionals and emerging young artists, to showcase their work each year.
 Outreach programs confront addictions like alcohol and drugs head-on, and offer health and wellness initiatives to families who may not have access to these programs otherwise.
 More than 800 families are served through pastoral ministry programs in the various church communities.

Curriculum
The school has Lakota language classes. The school began teaching the language in 1967.

See also
 List of Jesuit sites
 Marquette University Special Collections and University Archives
 Oglala Lakota County School District
 Lakota Tech High School
 Pine Ridge School - Bureau of Indian Education school

References

External links
 Red Cloud Indian School Website
 The Heritage Center at Red Cloud Indian School Website
 Holy Rosary Mission - Red Cloud Indian School Digital Image Collection
 The Indian Sentinel, 1941-1960

Educational institutions established in 1888
Jesuit development centres
Roman Catholic Diocese of Rapid City
Catholic secondary schools in South Dakota
Jesuit schools in the United States
Jesuit high schools in the United States
Schools in Oglala Lakota County, South Dakota
Native American boarding schools
Private middle schools in South Dakota
Private elementary schools in South Dakota
Non-profit organizations based in the United States
Community-building organizations
Development charities based in the United States
Social welfare charities based in the United States
Cultural promotion organizations
1888 establishments in Dakota Territory
Education in Oglala Lakota County, South Dakota